The 2014–15 season was Queens Park Rangers's 126th professional season.

Kit
Supplier: Nike / Sponsor: AirAsia

Players
As of 4 March 2015

First team squad

Transfers

In

Out

Loaned in

Loaned out

Season statistics

Season summary

August
QPR Started their season with a 0–1 loss to Hull City at home, after James Chester headed in a corner early in the second half. On 21 August 2014 QPR announced the season long loan signing of Chilean international Eduardo Vargas.  On 24 August 2014 QPR lost 4-0 to Tottenham leaving them bottom of the table. Just three days after Rangers lost surprisingly to League 2 side Burton Albion in the League Cup 2nd round.   On 30 August 2014 QPR won their first game of the season against Sunderland thanks to a late first half goal from Charlie Austin.

September
QPR lost 4–0 away to Manchester United on 14 September. On 20 September loan signing Niko Kranjčar scored a late equalizer in a 2–2 draw against Stoke City. Rangers lost away at Southampton on 27 September.

League table

Results summary

Results by matchday

Friendlies

Competitions

Premier League

FA Cup

League Cup

Squad statistics

Statistics

|}

† denotes players that left the club during the season.

Goals

Own goals

Clean sheets

Discipline

Notes

References

Queens Park Rangers F.C. seasons
Queens Park Rangers